Coralliophila sertata is a species of medium-sized sea snail, a marine gastropod mollusk in the subfamily Coralliophilinae the coral snails, within the family Muricidae the rock snails.

References

 Powell A. W. B., New Zealand Mollusca, William Collins Publishers Ltd, Auckland, New Zealand 1979 
 Oliverio M. (2008) Coralliophilinae (Neogastropoda: Muricidae) from the southwest Pacific. In: V. Héros, R.H. Cowie & P. Bouchet (eds), Tropical Deep-Sea Benthos 25. Mémoires du Muséum National d'Histoire Naturelle 196: 481-585. page(s): 507

Gastropods of Australia
Gastropods of New Zealand
Gastropods described in 1903
Coralliophila